Mark Fawcett (born 17 January 1972) is a Canadian snowboarder. He competed at the 1998 Winter Olympics and the 2002 Winter Olympics.

References

External links
 

1972 births
Living people
Canadian male snowboarders
Olympic snowboarders of Canada
Snowboarders at the 1998 Winter Olympics
Snowboarders at the 2002 Winter Olympics
Sportspeople from Saint John, New Brunswick